Breaking Dad is a 2014 play by Paul Howard, as part of the Ross O'Carroll-Kelly series. It had its world premiere on 30 April 2014 at the Gaiety Theatre, Dublin produced by Landmark Productions.

The title is a reference to the TV series Breaking Bad.

Plot
The year is 2022. Ross is in his forties, and is horrified when his daughter Honor brings home her boyfriend Traolach — a little too similar to a young Ross. His father Charles is Director of Elections for a resurgent Fianna Fáil.

Reception
The Irish Independent was positive, saying "Although the future setting limits the comic material somewhat, there's more than enough humour to be had from Ross feeling the teething pains of a mid-life crisis, and the physical comedy involved in solving the paternity problem."

References

2014 plays
Irish plays
Plays set in Ireland
Ross O'Carroll-Kelly
Fiction set in 2022